Pollyana Duendy Alejandra Rivera Bigas (born 26 November 1974) is a Chilean journalist who was elected as a member of the Chilean Constitutional Convention.

In the Convention, she ran for Vicepresident, but lost to Jaime Bassa.

See also
 List of members of the Chilean Constitutional Convention

References

External links
 

Living people
1974 births
Chilean journalists
21st-century Chilean politicians
Members of the Chilean Constitutional Convention
Republican Party (Chile, 2019) politicians
21st-century Chilean women politicians
People from Arica